Timo Sutinen (born April 3, 1949 in Tampere, Finland) is a retired professional ice hockey player who played in the SM-liiga. He played in the SM-sarja and SM-liiga for KOOVEE, Jokerit, and FoPS. He also played in Germany's Eishockey-Bundesliga for VfL Bad Nauheim and Berliner SC Preussen. He was inducted into the Finnish Hockey Hall of Fame in 1991.

External links
 
 Finnish Hockey Hall of Fame bio

1949 births
Living people
Ice hockey people from Tampere
Finnish ice hockey forwards
Berliner SC players
FoPS players
Jokerit players
KOOVEE players
Rote Teufel Bad Nauheim players